The Danish Outdoor Council (Danish: Friluftsrådet) is a non-governmental umbrella organisation for organisations active in the promotion of outdoor, recreational activities as well as nature protection interests in Denmark. It was founded on 27 November 1942 and now has 94 member organisations.

Organisation
The highest authority of the Danish Outdoor Council is the General Assembly where all membership organisations are represented. The daily operation of the Outdoor Council is managed by a Board with 11 members and carried out by a Secretariat. The secretariat is located on Scandiagade in the Sydhavnen area of Copenhagen. It was founded in 1942 and now has 02 members.

Activities
The Danish Outdoor Council manages a number of schemes such as Blue Flag in Denmark, Green Flag, Green School and Green Spouts schemes. The Clover Trails (Kløverstier) network with 10 sign-posted hiking trails throughout Denmark was introduced in 2011. It is host organisation of the Foundation for Environmental Education ( FEE). The Danish Outdoor Council also manages the funds for outdoor, recreational activities through Danske Spil.

Nature parks
The Danish Outdoor Council runs a certification scheme for "natura parks" (Danish: Naturparker).

Current parks under the scheme are:
 Naturpark Åmosen 
 Naturpark Vesterhavet
 Naturoark Amager
 Naturpark Maribosøerne

Pilot projects:
 Naturpark Randers Fjord
 naturpark Lillbælt

Membership organisations

A members
 4H   
 Biologforbundet  
 BL-Danmarks Almene Boliger
 Børne- og Ungdomspædagogernes Landsforbund
 Danhostel Danmarks Vandrerhjem
 Danmarks civile Hundeførerforening 
 Danmarks Cykle Union
 Danmarks Fritidssejler Union 
 Danmarks Jægerforbund 
 Danmarks Kulturarvs Forening 
 Danmarks Skiforbund 
 Danmarks socialdemokratiske Ungdom
 Danmarks Sportsfiskerforbund 
 Danish Cyclists' Federation  
 Danish Ornithological Society 
 Dansk Amatørfiskerforening    
 Dansk Autocamper Forening
 Dansk Automobil Sports Union   
 Dansk Faldskærms Union
 Dansk Firmaidrætsforbund  
 Dansk Forening for Rosport   
 Dansk Friluftsliv - forum for natur og friluftsliv    
 Dansk Fritidsfiskerforbund     
 Dansk Golf Union
 Dansk Islandshesteforening   
 Dansk Kano og Kajak Forbund   
 Dansk Kennel Klub  
 Dansk Land-Rover Klub    
 Dansk Naturist Union    
 Dansk Orienterings-Forbund       
 Dansk Ride Forbund      
 Dansk Sejlunion   
 Dansk Surf & Rafting Forbund
 Dansk Svæveflyver Union   
 Dansk Ungdoms Fællesråd
 Dansk Vandrelaug     
 Dansk Vandski & Wakeboard Forbund
 Danske Baptisters Spejderkorps    
 DGI
 Danske Naturister
 Danske Tursejlere   
 De grønne pigespejdere    
 De Gule Spejdere 
 Det Danske Spejderkorps    
 DK-CAMP     
 Dyrenes Beskyttelse
 Federation of Danish Motorists 
 FDF, Frivilligt Drenge- og Pige-Forbund   
 Folkeferie.dk
 Geografforbundet  
 Haveselskabet
 Havkajakroerne      
 KFUM-Spejderne i Danmark  
 Kolonihaveforbundet for Danmark    
 LandboUngdom     
 Landsforbundet DUI-Leg og Virke  
 Landsforeningen af Ungdomsskoleledere
 Modelflyvning Danmark 
 Miljøbevægelsen NOAH   
 National Olympic Committee and Sports Confederation of Denmark
 Natur og Ungdom   
 Naturvejlederforeningen i Danmark   
 Royal Danish Aero Club 
 Sct. Georgs Gilderne i Danmark    
 Træskibs Sammenslutningen
 Ungdomsringen    
 WWF Verdensnaturfonden

B members
 Campingrådet
 Copenhagen Zoo
 Dansk Falkejagtklub
 Dansk Retursystem 
 Dansk Turismefremme     
 Danske Handicaporganisationer   
 Danske Skov- og Landskabsingeniører og Have- og Parkingeniører    
 Efterskoleforeningen   
 Fiskeringen  
 Foreningen Lydum Mølle
 Kommunale Park- og Naturforvaltere         
  Land of Legends
 Ringkøbing-Skjern Museum
 Sammenslutningen af Danske Småøer

References

External links
 Official website
 Membership organisations
 Publications

Organizations based in Copenhagen
1942 establishments in Denmark
Organizations established in 1942